The following is a list of FCC-licensed radio stations in the U.S. state of Mississippi, which can be sorted by their call signs, frequencies, cities of license, licensees, and programming formats.

List of radio stations

Defunct
 WAKK
 WCBI
 WCMR-FM
 WCSA
 WEPA
 WETX
 WGRM
 WHLV
 WHSY (1230 AM)
 WIGG
 WILU-LP
 WJNS
 WKOR
 WKOZ
 WKXG
 WLGD
 WMLC
 WMOX
 WNBN
 WOKJ
 WQBC
 WQMA
 WQST
 WSAO
 WSWG
 WXAB
 WZHL
 WZRX

See also
 Mississippi media
 List of newspapers in Mississippi
 List of television stations in Mississippi
 Media of locales in Mississippi: Biloxi, Gulfport, Hattiesburg, Jackson

References

Bibliography

External links

  (Directory ceased in 2017)
 Mississippi Association of Broadcasters

Images

 
Mississippi
Radio